Governor John R. Rogers High School is a high school in the Puyallup School District of Washington, United States. Commonly referred to as "Rogers" or "RHS," the high school is named after former Washington State governor John Rankin Rogers. It was first opened in 1968.

Academics
Between the three comprehensive high schools in the district, Rogers ranks second in test scores. In the 2009–2010 school year, 10th graders showed 84.1% competency in Reading, 45.7% in Math, 93.4% in Writing and 43.0% in Science on the High School Proficiency Exam (HSPE).

Athletics & Other Activities

Rogers currently competes in the South Puget Sound League's south division, which also includes rivals Puyallup High School, Emerald Ridge High School, and Bethel High School. This division falls under the 4A classification, which is for the largest schools in the state. Rogers has 10 WIAA-sanctioned sports in which they compete in the 4A South Puget Sound League.

Rogers High School supports a sizable number of elective offerings such as art, music, drama, debate, world languages, business and marketing, leadership, teaching careers, and medical science. In addition, unique career pathway programs (called magnet programs in the Puyallup School District) include JROTC, botany, ACE academy (construction and drafting), and welding.

Awards
RHS students have won many state awards from the Washington Journalism Education Association and the Washington State Music Teachers Association, and national awards from the Journalism Education Association.

Notable alumni
 John Albert – professional Mixed Martial Artist, formerly competing in the UFC
 Davey Armstrong – United States of America team Boxer 1972 & 1976 Olympics
 Sarah Butler – actress
 Chad Eaton – Retired NFL Defensive End, Seattle Seahawks
 Brandon Gibson – Wide Receiver, Miami Dolphins
 Nick Harmer – Bass player, Death Cab for Cutie
 Logan Ice – baseball player 
 Jason Johnson (Canadian football), former Canadian Football League player
Angela Ruch - Professional stock car racing driver
 Ronald J. Shurer - recipient of the Medal of Honor

References

External links

Educational institutions established in 1968
High schools in Pierce County, Washington
Magnet schools in Washington (state)
Public high schools in Washington (state)
Puyallup, Washington
South Puget Sound League